Ernest Jack Neuman (February 27, 1921 – January 15, 1998) was an Edgar and Peabody award-winning American writer and producer.

Early years 
Neuman was born in Toledo, Ohio. He moved to Denver, Colorado, as a child and graduated from Regis Jesuit High School. He attended Colorado State College in Greeley and then transferred to the University of Missouri, where he majored in journalism. He served in the U.S. Marines in World War II in the radio division of Special Services.

Career 
Neuman wrote for dramatic radio shows such as On Stage; Yours Truly, Johnny Dollar; Richard Diamond, Private Detective; Hallmark Hall of Fame; Fort Laramie; Pursuit; and Suspense. He wrote some episodes of Yours Truly, Johnny Dollar and Have Gun, Will Travel under the pseudonyms John Dawson and Jack Dawson.

His many television credits include episodes of Frontier, Wagon Train, Bonanza, The Untouchables, Dr. Kildare, The Twilight Zone, The Asphalt Jungle, and Gunsmoke. In his lone film, The Venetian Affair (1967) he was writer, producer, and uncredited actor.

While writing for television and radio, he took creative writing classes and eventually earned a law degree from the University of California-Los Angeles. He later taught creative writing at UCLA and University of Southern California.

Personal life 
Neuman was married first to Irene Booth, with whom he had four children, and then to Marian Collier from 1970 until his death.

Death 
He died on January 15, 1998, in Los Angeles, aged 76.

Papers
The Wisconsin Historical Society is home to the E. Jack Neuman Papers, 1935–1982. The collection includes scripts, correspondence, production reports, and other material from his career.

Television work

References

External links 
 

1998 deaths
1921 births
Missouri School of Journalism alumni
Edgar Award winners
Peabody Award winners
American radio writers
American television producers
American television writers
University of Missouri alumni
Emmy Award winners
20th-century American screenwriters
United States Marine Corps personnel of World War II